Leontes, (foaled 29 January 2013) is a Japanese Thoroughbred racehorse and sire. He was rated the best two-year-old in Japan in 2015 after winning a minor race on his debut and then taking the Grade 1 Asahi Hai Futurity Stakes on his second and final start of the year. In the following spring he finished second in the Yayoi Sho, fourth in the Satsuki Sho and fifth in the Tokyo Yushun before his track career was ended by injury.

Background
Leontes is a dark bay or brown horse, standing 1.67 metres, with no white markings bred in Japan by Northern Farm. During his racing career he was owned by U Carrot Farm and trained by Katsuhiko Sumii. He was ridden in most of his races by the Italian-born jockey Mirco Demuro.

His sire, King Kamehameha was one of the best Japanese colts of his generation, beating a field including Heart's Cry and Daiwa Major in the 2004 Japanese Derby. His other winners as a breeding stallion include Lord Kanaloa, Rose Kingdom, Rey de Oro, Apapane and Duramente. Leontes' dam Cesario was a top-class racemare won the Yushun Himba and the American Oaks and went on to produce the Japan Cup winner Epiphaneia and Saturnalia. She was a fourth-generation descendant of the Epsom Oaks winner Pia. As a fourth-generation descendant of the Epsom Oaks winner Pia, Cesario was related to other major winners, including Chief Singer and Pleasantly Perfect.

Racing career

2015: two-year-old season
Leontes did not appear on the track until 22 November when he contested an event for previously unraced juveniles over 2000 metres at Kyoto Racecourse and won by a length from Peace Mind. For his next race the colt was stepped up sharply in class for the Grade 1 Asahi Hai Futurity Stakes over 1600 metres at Hanshin Racecourse on 15 December and started the 4.9/1 second favourite behind the Daily Hai Nisai Stakes winner Air Spinel. Leontes raced at the rear of the field and was still last of the sixteen runners as the field exited the final turn. He then produced a strong, sustained run on the outside, overtook Air Spinel in the last 100 metres and won by three quarters of a length. Mirco Demuro commented "I had been told that this colt was powerful and he certainly showed that when I rode him in training on Wednesday—he was pretty keen but smart and an honest colt. It was his first time over a mile but he responded and really stretched well on the outside. He's got a lot to look forward to in his three-year-old season."

In the JRA Awards for 2015 Leontes topped the poll for the JRA Award for Best Two-Year-Old Colt taking 289 of the 291 votes.

2016: three-year-old season
On his first run of 2016 Leontes started 0.9/1 favourite for the Grade 2 Yayoi Sho (a major trial race for the Shuka Sho) over 2000 metres at Nakayama Racecourse. He took the lead entering the straight and broke clear of his rivals but was caught in the final strides and beaten a neck by Makahiki. In the Shuka Sho over the same course and distance on 17 April Leontes started second favourite behind Satono Diamond. As in the Yayoi Sho he took the lead at the start of the straight but was outrun in the closing stages, coming home fourth of the eighteen runners behind Dee Majesty, Makahiki and Satono Diamond. He was demoted to fifth place for causing interference to Air Spinel in the straight. On 29 May Leontes started the 4.5/1 fourth choice in the betting for the Tokyo Yushun over 2400 metres at Tokyo Racecourse. In a change of tactic he was restrained towards the rear before producing a strong late run but was unable to reach the leaders and finished fifth behind Makahiki.

When being prepared for an autumn campaign Leontes suffered a tendon injury to his left foreleg which ended his season. He was retired from racing at the end of the year.

Stud career
Leontes began his stud career in 2017 at the Breeders Stallion Station in Hokkaido.

Pedigree

References 

2013 racehorse births
Racehorses bred in Japan
Racehorses trained in Japan
Thoroughbred family 16-a